The chestnut-crowned antpitta (Grallaria ruficapilla) is a species of bird in the family Grallariidae. It is found in Colombia, Ecuador, Peru, and Venezuela. Its natural habitats are subtropical or tropical moist montane forest and heavily degraded former forest, which it has a much greater tolerance for than most antpittas.

It has an orange-rufous head and nape. The back is olive brown and the throat is white. The belly is white overlaid with black-brown streaking, mainly on the sides and the flanks. The legs are gray-blue. This combination of field marks renders this species fairly distinctive when seen.

Though shy and secretive like all Grallaria to some extent, this species hops into the open reasonably often, though rarely far from cover. Most often they range into open areas at or soon after dawn. In some areas, this species has become habituated to being fed worms, and in exchange can be watched by birdwatchers. The frequently heard song is often delivered from a slightly elevated perch and is loud, distinctive repeated "wheuu".

References
 The Birds of Ecuador by Robert S. Ridgely & Paul Greenfield. Cornell University Press (2001), .

External links

chestnut-crowned antpitta
Birds of the Northern Andes
chestnut-crowned antpitta
Taxonomy articles created by Polbot
Taxa named by Frédéric de Lafresnaye